South Kesteven District Council in Lincolnshire, England is elected every four years. Since the last boundary changes in 2015, 56 councillors have been elected from 30 wards.

Political control
The first election to the council was held in 1973, initially operating as a shadow authority before coming into its powers on 1 April 1974. Political control of the council since 1973 has been held by the following parties:

Leadership
The leaders of the council since 2002 have been:

Council elections
Summary of the results of recent council elections, click on the year for full details of each election. Boundary changes took place for the 1999 and 2015 elections, with the number of councillors being reduced from 58 to 56 in 2015.

1973 South Kesteven District Council election
1976 South Kesteven District Council election
1979 South Kesteven District Council election (New ward boundaries)
1983 South Kesteven District Council election

District result maps

By-election results
By-elections occur when seats become vacant between council elections. Below is a summary of recent by-elections; full by-election results can be found by clicking on the by-election name.

References

External links
South Kesteven District Council

 
Council elections in Lincolnshire
South Kesteven